Samuel Frederick Smith (born 19 May 1992) is an English singer and songwriter. In October 2012, they featured on Disclosure's breakthrough single "Latch", which peaked at number eleven on the UK Singles Chart. They were featured on Naughty Boy's "La La La", which became a number one single in May 2013. In December 2013, Smith was nominated for the 2014 Brit Critics' Choice Award and the BBC's Sound of 2014 poll, winning both.

Smith's debut studio album, In the Lonely Hour, was released in May 2014 on Capitol Records UK. The album's lead single, "Lay Me Down", was released prior to "La La La". The album's second single, "Money on My Mind", became their second number one single in the UK. The third single, "Stay with Me", was internationally successful, reaching number one in the UK and number two on the US Billboard Hot 100, while subsequent singles "I'm Not the Only One" and "Like I Can" reached the top ten in the UK. The album won four awards, at the 57th Annual Grammy Awards, including Best Pop Vocal Album, Best New Artist, Record of the Year, Song of the Year, and nominations for Album of the Year and Best Pop Solo Performance.

For Smith's and Jimmy Napes's song "Writing's on the Wall", the theme for the James Bond film Spectre (2015), they won the Golden Globe Award and the Academy Award for Best Original Song. Smith's second studio album, The Thrill of It All, was released in November 2017 and debuted atop the UK and US album charts. The lead single, "Too Good at Goodbyes", reached number one in the UK and Australia and number four in the US. Following the 2018 single "Promises" with Calvin Harris, which peaked at number one in the UK, Smith released "Dancing with a Stranger" with Normani in 2019, which reached the top ten in the UK and the US and was nominated for Song of the Year at the 2020 Brit Awards; and later "How Do You Sleep?", all of which feature on their third album, Love Goes (2020). In 2022, Smith's single "Unholy" with Kim Petras, from Smith's fourth album Gloria (2023), became their first number one single in the US and won the Grammy Award for Best Pop Duo/Group Performance.

Smith's achievements include five Grammy Awards, three Brit Awards, three Billboard Music Awards, and an American Music Award, as well as a Golden Globe and an Academy Award. Smith is the first openly non-binary musician to both release a song that reached No. 1 at the Billboard Hot 100 and to win a Grammy Award.

Early life
Samuel Frederick Smith was born in London on 19 May 1992, to Frederick Smith and broker Kate Cassidy. Smith grew up in Great Chishill, where they attended Thomas More Primary School. They were bullied for having breasts as a child and underwent liposuction at age 12. As part of Youth Music Theatre UK, Smith appeared in the troupe's 2007 production of Oh! Carol, a musical featuring the music of Neil Sedaka. Before entering the musical theatre, they had been in jazz bands. While studying singing and songwriting under jazz pianist Joanna Eden for a number of years, Smith attended St Mary's Catholic School in Bishop's Stortford and was a member of the Bishop's Stortford Junior Operatics (now Bishops Stortford Musical Theatre Society) and the Cantate Youth Choir. Smith attended the Anglican St Mary the Virgin, Saffron Walden with family members, as a youth.

Music career

2008–2009: Career beginnings with debut singles
Smith released two singles before 2010, "Bad Day All Week" from 2008 and "When It's Alright" from 2009.

2012–2013: Breakthrough
Smith was featured on the Disclosure song "Latch", which was released on 8 October 2012 and peaked at No. 11 on the UK Singles Chart. In February 2013, Smith released the first single from their debut album, "Lay Me Down", and later in the year featured on Naughty Boy's single "La La La". It was released on 19 May 2013 and peaked at No. 1 on the UK Singles Chart. Smith's first EP Nirvana was released the following year. The first song on the EP, titled "Safe with Me", is produced by Two Inch Punch and was first broadcast on MistaJam's BBC Radio 1Xtra show on 24 July 2013. The second song on the EP is titled "Nirvana" and is produced by Craze & Hoax and Jonathan Creek. The EP also includes Smith's acoustic solo version of "Latch" and a live version of "I've Told You Now". Smith released the Disclosure, Nile Rodgers, and Jimmy Napes collaboration "Together" on 25 November 2013 as the only single from Settle: The Remixes.

2014–2016: In the Lonely Hour and international success

The second single from Smith's debut album, titled "Money on My Mind", was released on 16 February 2014. It was announced on 16 December that Smith's debut studio album, titled In the Lonely Hour, would be released on 26 May 2014 through Capitol Records. Smith described the album as "all about unrequited love" stemming from personal experience, having never been loved back by any previous love interests. The album reached number one in the UK Albums Chart and number two on the Billboard 200, and by 5 November it had become the second biggest selling album of 2014 in the US behind only 1989 by Taylor Swift. In January 2015, In the Lonely Hour was named the second best selling album of 2014 in the UK, behind x by Ed Sheeran. A live version of album track "I've Told You Now", performed at St Pancras Old Church, was made available as a free download as part of an Amazon.com promotion on 27 December 2013. The album track "Make It To Me", co-written by Howard of Disclosure and Jimmy Napes, was made available as a free download as part of an iTunes Store promotion on 13 January 2014. Smith went on their debut American headlining tour in the second quarter of 2014, with a setlist of primarily new material.

On 20 January 2014, Smith made their American television debut performing "Latch" with Disclosure on Late Night with Jimmy Fallon. Smith also performed on Saturday Night Live on 29 March 2014, performing the gospel-tinged "Stay with Me" and an acoustic version of "Lay Me Down". "Stay with Me" reached number one on the UK Singles Chart and number two on the US Billboard Hot 100. The fourth single from the album, "I'm Not the Only One", reached number three in the UK and number five in the US.

In June 2014, Smith first appeared on the cover of The Fader in its 92nd issue. In August 2014, their single "Stay with Me" was named Variance Magazine's Song of Summer. Smith performed "Stay With Me" live at the 2014 MTV Video Music Awards on 24 August at The Forum in Inglewood, California. On 15 November 2014, they joined the charity group Band Aid 30 along with other British and Irish pop acts, recording the latest version of the track "Do They Know It's Christmas?" at Sarm West Studios in Notting Hill, London, to raise money for the 2014 Ebola crisis in Western Africa.

In 2015, it came to light that singer Tom Petty, noting similarities between "Stay with Me" and his 1989 hit song "I Won't Back Down", had negotiated an out-of-court settlement with Smith in October 2014. Petty and co-composer Jeff Lynne were awarded 12.5 percent of the royalties from "Stay with Me", and the names of Petty and Lynne joined James John Napier (known professionally as Jimmy Napes) in the ASCAP song credit. At the 57th Annual Grammy Awards, held on 8 February 2015, at the Staples Center in Los Angeles, Smith performed "Stay with Me" and also received four Grammy Awards: Best New Artist, Record of the Year and Song of the Year (for "Stay with Me") and Best Pop Vocal Album (for In the Lonely Hour). At the 2015 Brit Awards held at The O2 Arena in London on 25 February, they performed "Lay Me Down", and won the Brit Awards for British Breakthrough Act, and Global Success.

In March 2015, "Lay Me Down" was re-released as the sixth single from the album, peaking at number 8 on the Billboard Hot 100 (Smith's third US top 10 single). The same month, Smith recorded another version of the song, featuring John Legend, for the British charity telethon Comic Relief, which reached number one in the UK. At the 2015 Billboard Music Awards on 17 May, Smith received three Billboard Awards: Top Male Artist, Top New Artist, and Top Radio Songs Artist. They featured on Disclosure's single "Omen", which was released on 27 July 2015.

On 8 September 2015, Smith and Jimmy Napes confirmed that they had composed "Writing's on the Wall", the theme song to Spectre, the 24th James Bond film. The song was released on 25 September 2015 and became the first James Bond theme to reach number one in the UK. On 19 October, Smith was presented with two Guinness World Records—one for recording the first James Bond theme song to go to number one in the UK and another for scoring the most consecutive weeks in the UK top 10 by a debut album, for In the Lonely Hour.

At the 73rd Golden Globe Awards on 10 January 2016, they received the Award for Best Original Song for "Writing's on the Wall". On 14 January, the song earned Smith an Academy Award nomination for Best Original Song. In the nominations for the 2016 Brit Awards announced on 14 January, the song was among the nominees for Best British Video. Smith performed "Writing's on the Wall" at the Academy Awards on 28 February and, along with Napes, collected the prize for Best Original Song. In their acceptance speech, Smith referenced an article by Ian McKellen published before the awards ceremony that claimed no openly gay man had won an Oscar for Best Actor; Smith misquoted McKellen as saying that no gay man in general had won an Oscar. This was quickly discredited by openly gay recipient Dustin Lance Black, but McKellen mentioned that the error "doesn't detract" from Smith's achievement.

2016–2018: The Thrill of It All

Throughout 2016, Smith released footage of themself in the studio working on new music, leading up to the release of their second studio album. In late 2016, Smith was said to be working with Adam Lambert on new material. In early 2017, it was reported that Smith would be releasing their second album in September 2017 and had recorded with constant collaborator Jimmy Napes and Naughty Boy. In April 2017, Smith was said to have been in studio sessions with classical crossover group Clean Bandit, working on a possible "comeback single". Along with Clean Bandit, record producer Timbaland and musician Frances said they had worked on songs for Smith's next album.

On 8 September 2017, Smith released a new single titled "Too Good at Goodbyes", which debuted at number one in the United Kingdom and number five on the US Billboard Hot 100. Their second studio album, The Thrill of It All, debuted atop the UK Albums Chart and the US Billboard 200, becoming their first number one album in the US. On 20 March 2018, Smith started The Thrill of It All Tour, which visited Europe, North America, Asia, New Zealand and Australia. On 27 March 2018, they released "Pray" featuring American rapper Logic. On 17 August 2018, the singer collaborated as the main vocalist on Calvin Harris's new track "Promises". The song became Smith's seventh number one hit on the UK Singles Chart and their first top song on Billboard'''s Dance/Mix Show Airplay chart. They also released the song "Fire on Fire" as the Watership Down soundtrack.

2019–present: Love Goes and Gloria

In January 2019, Smith released the song "Dancing with a Stranger" with Normani as a single and it reached the top ten in the UK, the US and other countries. In February, Smith performed a medley of songs alongside Calvin Harris, Rag'n'Bone Man and Dua Lipa at the 2019 Brit Awards held at the O2 Arena in London. On 6 July 2019, New 102.7 radio host Mike Adam announced the song "How Do You Sleep?" on their Twitter account. On 9 July 2019, Smith posted on social media that an announcement would be made the following day. The pre-order link became active on 10 July, and later the same day, they formally announced and shared a clip of the song.

In October 2019, in an interview with The Zach Sang Show, Smith expressed excitement about their upcoming record. The singer also confirmed that their newest offering will feature fewer ballads and plenty of poppier tracks in the vein of their recent two previous singles. "I feel like I have recently shown a side of me which I normally keep to myself or for my family and friends," Smith told Sang. "I showed everyone it and everyone loved it. It's almost given me permission to kinda do what I've always dreamed of doing but I was always scared to do, which is pop music." The singer also described having been spurred on to write new music following a 2018 collaboration with Calvin Harris, "Promises". "I just naturally started getting back into the studio and started to write," they said. "I caught this wind and started riding this wave and I haven't stopped writing since."

On 13 February 2020, Smith revealed that a third studio album, then titled To Die For, was scheduled to be released on 1 May. On 30 March, Smith announced that, due to the ongoing effects of the COVID-19 pandemic, they would be delaying the release of their third album and would include a number of changes to the album track list and the title, as they would continue to work on it. However, they did state that it would still be released sometime within 2020. "I'm Ready", a collaboration with American singer Demi Lovato was released on 16 April and charted well in the top 40 of several countries. On 6 July, Smith released their cover of Coldplay's "Fix You". They had originally performed the song earlier in May for the iHeartRadio Living Room Series. On 17 September, they released a new single, "Diamonds", and then announced the new title for their third album, Love Goes, which was released on 30 October. On 29 September they announced that they would be performing a livestream concert on 30 October from Abbey Road Studios in London, their only live performance of 2020. The concert featured guest appearances by British actress Jade Anouka on "My Oasis" and singer Labrinth on "Love Goes", and included a cover version of "Time After Time", which drew praise from the song's original singer and writer Cyndi Lauper. The concert was recorded and released as a live album, Love Goes: Live at Abbey Road Studios, on 19 March 2021. The same year, Smith recorded a cover of "You Will Be Found", in collaboration with Summer Walker, for the soundtrack album of the 2021 film adaptation of Dear Evan Hansen. Their version of the song also plays during the closing credits of the film itself.

On 25 August 2022, Smith announced that they had collaborated with German singer Kim Petras on a song titled "Unholy", with Petras calling it "the best song" she has been part of. The first single from Smith's fourth studio album Gloria, it reached number one in the UK, the US (Smith's first US chart topper), Australia and other markets. The song made Smith and Petras the first openly non-binary and first openly transgender musicians, respectively, to release a song that reached No. 1 at the Billboard Hot 100.

On 18 November, Smith released the single "Night Before Christmas", which was added to their EP The Holly & the Ivy.Gloria was released on 27 January 2023, garnering generally favourable reviews from critics.

On February 6, 2023, Smith and Petras won the Best Pop Duo/Group Performance for "Unholy". This made them the first openly non-binary and openly transgender artists to win a Grammy Award.

Artistry
Influences

Smith cited Adele and Amy Winehouse as primary influences."This Week's Fresh Music" (17 May 2014). 4Music. Retrieved 28 July 2015 They admire Adele's "honesty in her music" and the way she has handled fame; they expressed a wish to maintain a similar public image. Winehouse's debut album Frank was the first album Smith ever bought. Early in their career, Smith received advice from Mary J. Blige and Chaka Khan, both of whom they listened to during their youth; Smith said that this inspired them to offer help to new artists themself. They called Taylor Swift a "role model" and praised her "soulfulness" as well as her "honesty".

Smith stated that the story of Lady Gaga's career beginnings encouraged them to move to London in order to start their own career. They also credited her with helping them come out as non-binary. Smith described Robyn as a major influence on Love Goes and said that they listened to her "nonstop" while making the album because they "could dance and be sad at the same time and feel empowered". They further cited Beyoncé and Christina Aguilera as sources of inspiration and empowerment. Speaking to Rolling Stone in January 2016, Smith named Whitney Houston and Mariah Carey as the greatest R&B voices. Smith's other influences include Britney Spears and Brandy.

In an October 2017 interview for Attitude magazine, Smith spoke of the impact of their close friend Ed Sheeran's success: "It makes you push yourself. Watching him this past year has just been incredible, but yeah, of course it makes me hungry." They had previously mentioned to GQ in January 2015 that they "envy the competition that people like [Frank] Sinatra would have ... because you could tell he was working off them".

Vocal style
A VH1 profile of Smith's vocal coach Joanna Eden noted that Smith's vocal range "can soar from baritone to tenor for dramatic effect". Smith places a lot of emphasis on their voice and stated they tried to make it the main element of their debut album In the Lonely Hour. Following the release of the album, their vocals were often compared to those of Adele. Jessica Robertson of The Fader considers that Smith represents "a return of the virtuosic vocalist in popular music", in the vein of Whitney Houston and Luther Vandross. Jim Farber wrote for The New York Daily News that Smith is "utterly unafraid to sound feminine"; Mary J. Blige thought that Smith was a black woman when she first heard them sing on Disclosure's "Latch". Asked about the "diva quality" of their voice, Smith remarked in January 2014:

Personal life
In May 2014, Smith came out to the public as gay and acknowledged a two-month long relationship—since ended—with actor and model Jonathan Zeizel. In 2015, at the 57th Annual Grammy Awards when "Stay with Me" won an award for Record of the Year, they said, "I want to thank the man who this record is about, who I fell in love with last year. Thank you so much for breaking my heart because you got me four Grammys!" In October 2017, Smith stated that their latest album, The Thrill of It All, showed "the gay guy I've become". In September 2017, Smith revealed a relationship with actor Brandon Flynn in an interview on The Ellen DeGeneres Show. In June 2018, it was announced that Smith and Flynn had split after nine months of dating.

In October 2017, Smith came out as genderqueer, saying, "I feel just as much a woman as I am a man" and speaking of a period in their youth where they "didn't own a piece of male clothing and would wear full makeup while attending school". In September 2019, they came out as non-binary and changed their preferred gender pronouns to they/them, stating, "After a lifetime of being at war with my gender I've decided to embrace myself for who I am, inside and out..."

Smith is the godparent of close friend and collaborator Jimmy Napes's son. Smith identifies as a feminist; they have struggled with body image issues since their preteen years and have been open about this in interviews.

DiscographyIn the Lonely Hour (2014)The Thrill of It All (2017)Love Goes (2020)Gloria'' (2023)

Tours
In the Lonely Hour Tour (2015)
The Thrill of It All Tour (2018)
 Gloria the Tour (2023)

Filmography

Awards and nominations

See also

 List of highest-certified music artists in the United States
List of artists who reached number one on the UK Singles Chart
List of best-selling singles in the United States

Notes

References

External links

Profile, samsmithsinger.com; accessed 14 February 2015.
Smith profile, MTV.com; accessed 14 February 2015.

 
1992 births
Living people
Brit Award winners
English tenors
English songwriters
English pop singers
English soul singers
English feminists
Feminist musicians
Gay feminists
English gay musicians
People with non-binary gender identities
LGBT feminists
English LGBT singers
English LGBT songwriters
English non-binary people
Capitol Records artists
Singers from London
Golden Globe Award-winning musicians
Grammy Award winners
Best Original Song Academy Award-winning songwriters
21st-century English singers
Ballad musicians
Alumni of British Youth Music Theatre
Juno Award for International Album of the Year winners
Non-binary singers
Non-binary songwriters
20th-century English LGBT people
21st-century English LGBT people